Anastasia Belyakova (born 1 May 1993) is a Russian boxer. She competed in the women's lightweight event at the 2016 Summer Olympics.

References

External links
 

1993 births
Living people
Russian women boxers
Olympic boxers of Russia
Boxers at the 2016 Summer Olympics
Place of birth missing (living people)
Olympic bronze medalists for Russia
Olympic medalists in boxing
Medalists at the 2016 Summer Olympics
European Games gold medalists for Russia
European Games medalists in boxing
Boxers at the 2015 European Games
Boxers at the 2019 European Games
European Games bronze medalists for Russia
AIBA Women's World Boxing Championships medalists
Lightweight boxers